The 2023 season will be the New York Jets' upcoming 54th season in the National Football League, their 64th overall, their fifth under general manager Joe Douglas and their third under head coach Robert Saleh. They will attempt to improve on their 7–10 record from 2022, make the playoffs for the first time since 2010, and put an end to 7 consecutive losing records.

Draft

Notes
 The Jets traded their 2023 sixth-round selection to Jacksonville in exchange for running back James Robinson.
 The Houston Texans traded their 2023 sixth-round selection to New York in exchange for linebacker Blake Cashman. 
 The Jets traded their 2023 seventh-round selection and nose tackle Steve McLendon to Tampa Bay in exchange for a 2022 sixth-round selection.

Staff

Current roster

Preseason
The Jets' preseason opponents and schedule will be announced in the spring.

Regular season

2023 opponents
Listed below are the Jets' opponents for 2023. Exact dates and times will be announced in the spring.

References

External links
 

New York Jets
New York Jets seasons
New York Jets